The Florida–Kentucky men's basketball rivalry is an annual rivalry series between the Florida Gators and the Kentucky Wildcats basketball teams. The two schools are permanent SEC rivals, meaning that they are scheduled to play twice a year in the SEC regular season while they rotate which four of the other 12 SEC teams they will play twice that season. Florida and Kentucky first met in 1927, with Kentucky winning 44–36. The two teams have played 149 times in total, with Kentucky holding a commanding 104-40 lead in the series. Despite Kentucky's lopsided series lead, this rivalry has produced many memorable games, including several match-ups in the SEC Tournament Championship Game (the most recent of which Florida defeated Kentucky 61–60, in 2014). Billy Donovan's arrival to Gainesville increased the competitiveness, with the rivalry placing seventh-best in college basketball on a 2013 ranking by Bleacher Report. In addition, the Gators also hold the distinction of being the only team to ever defeat Kentucky seven straight times.

Game results
Source

Kentucky leads the overall series 107–41, and leads the SEC Championship Game series 3–2. However, the rivalry has become much more even lately in the 2000s and 2010s, with Kentucky holding a 24–17 series lead since 2005, and Florida having a 2–1 advantage in the last three SEC Championship Game meetings. Kentucky victories are shaded blue, Florida victories are shaded orange. Games with * denote a meeting in the SEC Tournament, while games with ** denote a meeting in the SEC Tournament Championship Game.

References 

College basketball rivalries in the United States
Florida Gators men's basketball
Kentucky Wildcats men's basketball